The 1977 NCAA Division II football rankings are from the Associated Press. This is for the 1977 season.

Legend

Associated Press poll

Notes

References

Rankings
NCAA Division II football rankings